Heller is an American company that makes and sells indoor/outdoor furniture and accessories. It is headquartered in Westport, Connecticut, United States.

History
The company was founded in 1971 by Alan Heller.

In 2022 Heller was purchased by John Edelman and John McPhee.

In January, 2023 Heller relaunched their Vignelli Dinnerware collection at MoMA Design Store.

In February, 2023 Heller's Vignelli Dinnerware Bowls were selected by collaboration brand Supreme for their Spring/Summer 2023 Campaign. <ref name="Supreme/Heller Bowls (Set of 6)"></ref

Key Employees
John Edelman - President & CEO

Andrew McPhee - Vice President

Sebastian Espinal - Director

Nicholas Wargo - Manager

Tischana Noel - Manager

Designers
 Studio 65
 Sergio Asti
 Hlynur Atlason
 Mario Bellini
 Frank Gehry
 Vico Magistretti
 Jumbo NYC
 Giovanni Pagnotta
 William Sawaya
 Phillipe Starck
 Lella and Massimo Vignelli

Bellini Product Gallery

Gehry Product Gallery

Vignelli Product Gallery

Retail partners 

Design Within Reach, Room & Board, Lumens, 2Modern, Hive, MoMA Design Store

References

 Sabina Aouf, Rima (2023, January). Digby Design Authenticator links furniture with NFTs to fight counterfeiting. Dezeen
 Beall, Kelly (2022, November). F5: John Edelman Takes Us on a Journey, from Edelman Leather to Heller. Design Milk
 Carey, DJ (2022, October). John Edelman’s Next Chapter. Cottages & Gardens
 Gallaher, Rachel (2022, September). Give 'Em Heller. Gray Magazine
 Olsen, Carlene (2022, May). John Edelman Buys Heller, Solidifying His Return to the Furniture Industry. Interior Design
 Nicolaus, Fred (2022, May). John Edelman is back, and he’s bringing Heller with him. Business of Home
 Beck, Robert (2022, May). John Edelman Purchases Iconic American Furniture Manufacturer Heller. Office Insight
 Green, Penelope. (2021, August). Alan Heller, Who Made Plastic Housewares Beautiful, Dies at 81. New York Times
 Matranga, Vicki. (2021, August). Remembering Housewares Design Visionary Alan Heller. New York Times
 Bernstein, Fred A. (2009, December). Is a Solution Within Reach?. New York Times

External links
Heller company website

Industrial design firms
Industrial design
Design companies established in 1971
Manufacturing companies established in 1971
American companies established in 1971
American brands
Compasso d'Oro Award recipients